Shallows (1984) is a novel by Australian author Tim Winton. It won the 1984 Miles Franklin Award, and was the 1985 joint winner of Western Australian Premier's Book Award - Fiction.

Carolyn See called it "a dark masterpiece that ranks with Moby-Dick".

Story outline

The novel is set in 1978 in the fictional town of Angelus, Western Australia.  The town is the last remaining remnant of Australia's whaling industry and the novel details the conflicts that arise as a group of outsiders, intent on closing down the whaling industry, come to town.

Critical reception

Marian Eldridge in The Canberra Times was impressed with the work: "It is a book resonant with meanings. On the surface it looks at a contemporary situation, a year-old relationship under strain as one partner becomes an active conservationist and the other an uncommitted, embarrassed observer.  Whatever one decides the novel is saying, Shallows is a satisfying book."

Awards 
1984 Miles Franklin Award.

1985 Joint Winner Western Australian Premier's Book Award - Fiction.

References

1984 Australian novels
20th-century Australian novels
Books about whaling
Environmental fiction books
Miles Franklin Award-winning works
Novels by Tim Winton